The Punjabis (ਪੰਜਾਬੀ ; romanised as Panjābīs), are an Indo-Aryan ethnolinguistic group associated with the Punjab region, comprising areas of eastern Pakistan and northwestern India. They generally speak Standard Punjabi or various Punjabi dialects on both sides.

The ethnonym is derived from the term Punjab (Five rivers) in Persian to describe the geographic region of the northwestern part of the Indian subcontinent, where five rivers Beas, Chenab, Jhelum, Ravi, and Sutlej merge into the Indus River, in addition of the now-vanished Ghaggar.

The coalescence of the various tribes, castes and the inhabitants of the Punjab region into a broader common "Punjabi" identity initiated from the onset of the 18th century CE. Historically, the Punjabi people were a heterogeneous group and were subdivided into a number of clans called biradari (literally meaning "brotherhood") or tribes, with each person bound to a clan. With the passage of time, tribal structures became replaced with a more cohesive and holistic society, as community building and group cohesiveness form the new pillars of Punjabi society.

Traditionally, the Punjabi identity is primarily linguistic, geographical and cultural. Its identity is independent of historical origin or religion and refers to those who reside in the Punjab region or associate with its population and those who consider the Punjabi language their mother tongue. Integration and assimilation are important parts of Punjabi culture, since Punjabi identity is not based solely on tribal connections. While Punjabis share a common territory, ethnicity and language, they are likely to be followers of one of several religions, most often Islam, Hinduism, Sikhism or Christianity.

Etymology 
The term "Punjab" came into currency during the reign of Akbar in the late sixteenth century. The word pañjāb thus means 'The Land of Five Waters', referring to the rivers Jhelum, Chenab, Ravi, Sutlej, and Beas. All are tributaries of the Indus River, the Sutlej being the largest. References to a land of five rivers may be found in the Mahabharata, which calls one of the regions in ancient Bharat Panchanada. The ancient Greeks referred to the region as Pentapotamía, which has the same meaning as the Persian word.

Geographic distribution

Punjab is a geopolitical, cultural, and historical region in South Asia, specifically in the northern part of the Indian subcontinent, comprising areas of eastern Pakistan and northwestern India. The boundaries of the region are ill-defined and focus on historical accounts. The geographical definition of the term "Punjab" has changed over time. In the 16th century Mughal Empire it referred to a relatively smaller area between the Indus and the Sutlej rivers.

Pakistan 
While the total population of Punjab is 110 million as noted in the 2017 Pakistan census, ethnic Punjabis comprise approximately 44.7% of the national population. With an estimated national population of 243 million in 2022, ethnic Punjabis thus number approximately 108.5 million in Pakistan; this makes Punjabis the largest ethnic group in Pakistan by population.

Religious homogeneity remains elusive as a predominant Sunni population with Shia, Ahmadiyya and Christian minorities.

India 
The Punjabi-speaking people make up 2.74% of India's population as of 2011. The total number of Indian Punjabis is unknown due to the fact that ethnicity is not recorded in the Census of India. Sikhs are largely concentrated in the modern-day state of Punjab forming 57.7% of the population with Hindus forming 38.5%. Ethnic Punjabis are believed to account for at least 40% of Delhi's total population and are predominantly Hindi-speaking Punjabi Hindus. The Indian censuses record the native languages, but not the descent of the citizens. Thus, there is no concrete official data on the ethnic makeup of Delhi and other Indian states.

Indian Punjab is also home to small groups of Muslims and Christians. Most of the East Punjab's Muslims left for West Punjab in 1947. However, a small community still exists today, mainly in Qadian, and Malerkotla.

Punjabi diaspora

The Punjabi people have emigrated in large numbers to many parts of the world. In the early 20th century, many Punjabis began settling in the United States, including independence activists who formed the Ghadar Party. The United Kingdom has a significant number of Punjabis from both Pakistan and India. The most populous areas being London, Birmingham, Manchester and Glasgow. In Canada (specifically Vancouver, Toronto, and Calgary) and the United States, (specifically California's Central Valley as well as the New York and New Jersey region). In the 1970s, a large wave of emigration of Punjabis (predominately from Pakistan) began to the Middle East, in places such as the UAE, Saudi Arabia and Kuwait. There are also large communities in East Africa including the countries of Kenya, Uganda and Tanzania. Punjabis have also emigrated to Australia, New Zealand and Southeast Asia including Malaysia, Thailand, Singapore and Hong Kong. Of recent times many Punjabis have also moved to Italy.

Demography

Castes and tribes 

The major tribes of West Punjab (Pakistan) are the Jats, Rajputs, Arains, Gujjars and Awans. Prior to the partition in 1947, major tribes of West Punjab also included the Khatris, Aroras and Brahmins.

While in East Punjab (India), Jats are almost 20 per cent of East Punjab's population. The Scheduled Castes constitute almost 32 per cent of its total population and 4.3 per cent of the SCs nationally, official data show. Of more than 35 designated Scheduled Castes in the state, the Mazhabis, the Ravidasias/Ramdasias, the Ad Dharmis, the Valmikis, and the Bazigars together make up around 87 per cent of East Punjab's total Scheduled Caste population. The Ravidasia Hindus and the Ramdasia Sikhs together constitute 26.2 per cent of East Punjab's total Scheduled Caste population. Both Ramdasias and Ravidasias are subgouups of the Chamar< and are traditionally linked to leather-related occupations.

Religions in Punjab 

The Punjabi people first practiced proto-Hinduism, the oldest recorded religion in the Punjab region. The historical Vedic religion constituted the religious ideas and practices in the Punjab during the Vedic period (1500–500 BCE), centered primarily in the worship of Indra. The bulk of the Rigveda was composed in the Punjab region between circa 1500 and 1200 BC, while later Vedic scriptures were composed more eastwards, between the Yamuna and Ganges rivers. An ancient Indian law book called the Manusmriti, developed by Brahmin Hindu priests, shaped Punjabi religious life from 200 BC onward.

Later, the spread of Buddhisim and Jainism in the Indian subcontinent saw the growth of Buddhism and Jainism in the Punjab. Islam was introduced via southern Punjab in the 8th century, becoming the majority by the 16th century, via local conversion. There was a small Jain community left in Punjab by the 16th century, while the Buddhist community had largely disappeared by the turn of the 10th century. The region became predominantly Muslim due to missionary Sufi saints whose dargahs dot the landscape of the Punjab region. 

The rise of Sikhism in the 1700s saw some Punjabis, both Hindu and Muslim, accepting the new Sikh faith. A number of Punjabis during the colonial period of India became Christians, with all of these religions characterizing the religious diversity now found in the Punjab region.

Modern era 
Due to religious tensions, emigration between Punjabi people started far before the partition and dependable records. Shortly prior to the Partition of India, Punjab Province (British India) had a slight majority Muslim population at about 53.2% in 1941, which was an increase from the previous years. 

Due to the partition of 1947, a rapid shift towards religious homogeneity occurred in all districts across the Punjab region owing to the new international border that cut through the province. This rapid demographic shift was primarily due to mass migration and population exchange but also caused by large-scale religious cleansing riots that occurred across the region at the time. According to historical demographer Tim Dyson, in the eastern regions of Punjab that ultimately became Indian Punjab following independence, districts that were 66% Hindu in 1941 became 80% Hindu in 1951; those that were 20% Sikh became 50% Sikh in 1951. Conversely, in the western regions of Punjab that ultimately became Pakistani Punjab, all districts became almost exclusively Muslim by 1951.

As a result of the population exchanges during partition, both parts of Punjab are now relatively homogeneous, as far as religion is concerned. Today the majority of Pakistani Punjabis follow Islam with a small Christian minority, and less Sikh and Hindu populations, while the majority of Indian Punjabis are either Sikhs or Hindus with a Muslim minority. Punjab is also the birthplace of Sikhism and the movement Ahmadiyya.

Punjabi Muslims

Punjabi Muslims are found almost exclusively in Pakistan with 97% of Punjabis who live in Pakistan following Islam, in contrast to Punjabi Sikhs and Punjabi Hindus who predominantly live in India.

Forming the majority of the Punjabi ethnicity in the greater Punjab region, Punjabi Muslims write the Punjabi language under the Perso-Arabic script known as Shahmukhi. With a population of more than 80 million, they are the largest ethnic group in Pakistan and the world's third-largest Islam-adhering ethnicity after Arabs and Bengalis. The majority of Punjabi Muslims are adherents of Sunni Islam, while a minority adhere to Shia Islam and other sects, including the Ahmadiyya community which originated in Punjab during the British Raj.

Punjabi Hindus
In the Indian state of Punjab, Punjabi Hindus make up approximately 38.5% of the state's population and are a majority in the Doaba region. Punjabi Hindus forms majority in five districts of Punjab, namely, Pathankot, Jalandhar, Hoshiarpur, Fazilka and Shaheed Bhagat Singh Nagar districts.

During the 1947 partition, millions of Punjabi Hindus (including Hindkowan Hindus and Saraiki Hindus) migrated from West Punjab and North-West Frontier Province, of which many ultimately settled in Delhi. Determined from 1991 and 2015 estimates, Punjabi Hindus form approximately 24 to 35 per cent of Delhi's population; based on 2011 official census counts, this amounts to between 4,029,106 and 5,875,779 people.

Following the large scale exodus that took place during the 1947 partition, there remains a small Punjabi Hindu community in Pakistan today. According to the 2017 Census, there are about 200,000 Hindus in Punjab province, forming approximately 0.2% of the total population. Much of the community resides in the primarily rural South Punjab districts of Rahim Yar Khan and Bahawalpur where they form 3.12% and 1.12% of the population respectively, while the rest are concentrated in urban centres such as Lahore. Punjabi Hindus in India use Nāgarī script to write the Hindi and Punjabi languages.

Punjabi Sikhs

Sikhism from Sikh, meaning a "disciple", or a "learner", is a monotheistic religion originated in the Punjab region of the Indian subcontinent during the 15th century. The fundamental beliefs of Sikhism, articulated in the sacred scripture Guru Granth Sahib, include faith and meditation on the name of the one creator, unity and equality of all humankind, engaging in selfless service, striving for social justice for the benefit and prosperity of all, and honest conduct and livelihood while living a householder's life. Being one of the youngest amongst the major world religions, with 25-28 million adherents worldwide, Sikhism is the fifth- largest religion in the world.

The Sikhs form a majority of close to 58% in the modern day Punjab, India.

Gurmukhi is the writing script used by Sikhs and for scriptures of Sikhism. It is used in official documents in parts of India and elsewhere. The tenth Guru of Sikhs, Guru Gobind Singh (1666 – 1708) established the Khalsa Brotherhood, and set for them a code of conduct.

Punjabi Christians

Most of the modern Punjabi Christians are descended from converts during British rule; initially, conversions to Christianity came from the "upper levels of Punjab society, from the privileged and prestigious", including "high caste" Hindu families, as well as Muslim families. However, other modern Punjabi Christians have converted from the Chuhra group. The Churas were largely converted to Christianity in North India during the British Raj. The vast majority were converted from the Hindu Chura communities of Punjab, and to a lesser extent Mazhabi Sikhs; under the influence of enthusiastic army officers and Christian missionaries. Large numbers of Mazhabi Sikhs were also converted in the Moradabad district and the Bijnor district of Uttar Pradesh. Rohilkhand saw a mass conversion of its entire population of 4500 Mazhabi Sikhs into the Methodist Church. Sikh organisations became alarmed at the rate of conversions among high caste Sikh families, and as a result, they responded by immediately dispatching Sikh missionaries to counteract the conversions.

History

Culture 

Punjabi culture grew out of the settlements along the five rivers, which served as an important route to the Near East as early as the ancient Indus Valley civilization, dating back to 3000 BCE. Agriculture has been the major economic feature of the Punjab and has therefore formed the foundation of Punjabi culture, with one's social status being determined by landownership. The Punjab emerged as an important agricultural region, especially following the Green Revolution during the mid-1960's to the mid-1970's, has been described as the "breadbasket of both India and Pakistan". Besides being known for agriculture and trade, the Punjab is also a region that over the centuries has experienced many foreign invasions and consequently has a long-standing history of warfare, as the Punjab is situated on the principal route of invasions through the northwestern frontier of the Indian subcontinent, which promoted to adopt a lifestyle that entailed engaging in warfare to protect the land. Warrior culture typically elevates the value of the community's honour (izzat), which is highly esteemed by Punjabis.

Language
Punjabi, sometimes spelled Panjabi, is an Indo-Aryan language natively spoken by the Punjabi people.

Punjabi is the most popular first language in Pakistan, with 80.5 million native speakers as per the 2017 census, and the 11th most popular in India, with 31.1 million native speakers, as per the 2011 census.

The language is spoken among a significant overseas diaspora, particularly in Canada, the United States, and the United Kingdom.

In Pakistan, Punjabi is written using the Shahmukhi alphabet, based on the Perso-Arabic script; in India, it is written using the Gurmukhi alphabet, based on the Indic scripts. Punjabi is unusual among the Indo-Aryan languages and the broader Indo-European language family in its usage of lexical tone.

Punjabi developed from Prakrit languages and later  ('deviated' or 'non-grammatical speech') From 600 BCE, Sanskrit was advocated as official language and Prakrit gave birth to many regional languages in different parts of India. All these languages are called Prakrit collectively. Paishachi Prakrit was one of these Prakrit languages, which was spoken in north and north-western India and Punjabi developed from this Prakrit. Later in northern India Paishachi Prakrit gave rise to Paishachi Aparbhsha, a descendant of Prakrit. Punjabi emerged as an Apabhramsha, a degenerated form of Prakrit, in the 7th century CE and became stable by the 10th century. The earliest writings in Punjabi belong to Nath Yogi era from 9th to 14th century CE. The language of these compositions is morphologically closer to Shauraseni Apbhramsa, though vocabulary and rhythm is surcharged with extreme colloquialism and folklore. The Arabic and modern Persian influence in the historical Punjab region began with the late first millennium Muslim conquests on the Indian subcontinent. Many Persian and Arabic words were incorporated in Punjabi. So Punjabi relies heavily on Persian and Arabic words which are used with a liberal approach to language. After the fall of the Sikh empire, Urdu was made the official language of Punjab (in Pakistani Punjab, it is still the primary official language), and influenced the language as well.

Punjabis also speak several languages and dialects related to Punjabi, such as the Pothwari spoken in the Pothohar region of Northern Pakistani Punjab

Traditional dress

Dastar

A Dastar is an item of headgear associated with Sikhism and is an important part of the Punjabi and Sikh culture. Among the Sikhs, the dastār is an article of faith that represents equality, honour, self-respect, courage, spirituality, and piety. The Khalsa Sikh men and women, who keep the Five Ks, wear the turban to cover their long, uncut hair (kesh). The Sikhs regard the dastār as an important part of the unique Sikh identity. After the ninth Sikh Guru, Tegh Bahadur, was sentenced to death by the Mughal emperor Aurangzeb, Guru Gobind Singh, the tenth Sikh Guru created the Khalsa and gave five articles of faith, one of which is unshorn hair, which the dastār covers. Prior to Sikhi, only kings, royalty, and those of high stature wore turbans, but Sikh Gurus adopted the practice to assert equality and sovereignty among people.
Punjabi suit

A Punjabi suit that features two items - a qameez (top), salwar (bottom) is the traditional attire of the Punjabi people. Shalwars are trousers which are atypically wide at the waist but which narrow to a cuffed bottom. They are held up by a drawstring or elastic belt, which causes them to become pleated around the waist. The trousers can be wide and baggy, or they can be cut quite narrow, on the bias. The kameez is a long shirt or tunic. The side seams are left open below the waist-line (the opening known as the chaak), which gives the wearer greater freedom of movement. The kameez is usually cut straight and flat; older kameez use traditional cuts; modern kameez are more likely to have European-inspired set-in sleeves. The combination garment is sometimes called salwar kurta, salwar suit, or Punjabi suit. The shalwar-kameez is a widely-worn, and national dress, of Pakistan. When women wear the shalwar-kameez in some regions, they usually wear a long scarf or shawl called a dupatta around the head or neck. The dupatta is also employed as a form of modesty—although it is made of delicate material, it obscures the upper body's contours by passing over the shoulders. For Muslim women, the dupatta is a less stringent alternative to the chador or burqa (see hijab and purdah); for Sikh and Hindu women, the dupatta is useful when the head must be covered, as in a temple or the presence of elders. Everywhere in South Asia, modern versions of the attire have evolved; the shalwars are worn lower down on the waist, the kameez have shorter length, with higher splits, lower necklines and backlines, and with cropped sleeves or without sleeves.

Music

Bhangra describes dance-oriented popular music with Punjabi rhythms, developed since the 1980s. Sufi music and Qawali, commonly practiced in Punjab, Pakistan; are other important genres in the Punjab region.

Dance

Punjabi dances are performed either by men or by women. The dances range from solo to group dances and also sometimes dances are done along with traditional musical instruments. Bhangra is one of the most famous dances originating in the Punjab by farmers during the harvesting season. It was mainly performed while farmers did agricultural chores. As they did each farming activity they would perform bhangra moves on the spot. This allowed them to finish their job in a pleasurable way. For many years, farmers performed bhangra to showcase a sense of accomplishment and to welcome the new harvesting season. Traditional bhangra is performed in a circle and is performed using traditional dance steps. Traditional bhangra is now also performed on occasions other than during the harvest season.

Folk tales

The folk tales of Punjab include Heer Ranjha, Mirza Sahiban, Sohni Mahiwal.

Festivals
The Punjabi Muslims typically observe the Islamic festivals. The Punjabi Sikhs and Hindus typically do not observe these, and instead observe Lohri, Basant and Vaisakhi as seasonal festivals. The Punjabi Muslim festivals are set according to the lunar Islamic calendar (Hijri), and the date falls earlier by 10 to 13 days from year to year. The Hindu and Sikh Punjabi seasonal festivals are set on specific dates of the luni-solar Bikrami calendar or Punjabi calendar and the date of the festival also typically varies in the Gregorian calendar but stays within the same two Gregorian months.

Some Punjabi Muslims participate in the traditional, seasonal festivals of the Punjab region: Baisakhi, Basant and to a minor scale Lohri, but this is controversial. Islamic clerics and some politicians have attempted to ban this participation because of the religious basis of the Punjabi festivals, and they being declared haram (forbidden in Islam).

Punjabi State 

According to Pippa Virdee, the 1947 partition of India and Pakistan has shadowed the sense of loss of what used to be a homeland nation for the Punjabi people in the Indian subcontinent and its diaspora. Since the mid-1980s, there has been a drive for Punjabi cultural revival, consolidation of Punjabi ethnicity and a virtual Punjabi nation. According to Giorgio Shani, this is predominantly a Sikh ethno-nationalism movement led by some Sikh organizations, and a view that is not shared by Punjabi people organizations belonging to other religions.

Notable people

See also
 Dialects of the Punjab
 Punjabi press
 Punjabi cuisine

Notes

References

Notes

Bibliography

Further reading
 
 Mohini Gupta, Encyclopaedia of Punjabi Culture & History – Vol. 1 (Window on Punjab) [Hardcover], 
 Iqbal Singh Dhillion, Folk Dances of Punjab 
 Punjabi Culture: Punjabi Language, Bhangra, Punjabi People, Karva Chauth, Kila Raipur Sports Festival, Lohri, Punjabi Dhabha, 
 Kamla C. Aryan, Cultural Heritage of Punjab 
 Shafi Aqeel, Popular Folk Tales from the Punjab 
 Online Book of Punjabi Folk Tales
 Colloquial Panjabi: The Complete Course for Beginners (Colloquial Series) 
 Gilmartin, David. Empire and Islam: Punjab and the Making of Pakistan. Univ of California Press (1988), .
 Grewal, J.S. and Gordon Johnson. The Sikhs of the Punjab (The New Cambridge History of India). Cambridge University Press; Reprint edition (1998), .
 Latif, Syed. History of the Panjab. Kalyani (1997), .
 Sekhon, Iqbal S. The Punjabis : The People, Their History, Culture and Enterprise. Delhi, Cosmo, 2000, 3 Vols., .
 Singh, Gurharpal. Ethnic Conflict in India : A Case-Study of Punjab. Palgrave Macmillan (2000).
 Singh, Gurharpal (Editor) and Ian Talbot (Editor). Punjabi Identity: Continuity and Change. South Asia Books (1996), .
 Singh, Khushwant. A History of the Sikhs – Volume 1.Oxford University Press, 
 Steel, Flora Annie. Tales of the Punjab : Told by the People (Oxford in Asia Historical Reprints). Oxford University Press, USA; New Ed edition (2002), .
 Tandon, Prakash and Maurice Zinkin. Punjabi Century 1857–1947, University of California Press (1968), .
 DNA boundaries in South and Southwest Asia, BMC Genetics 2004, 5:26
 Ethnologue Eastern Panjabi
 Ethnologue Western Panjabi
 
 Online 1 Online 2 Online 3 (A free copy of this book can be read from any 3 of the included "Online Sources" of this free "Online Book")
 The Legacy of The Punjab by R. M. Chopra, 1997, Punjabee Bradree, Calcutta.
 Glimpses of Punjabi society and everyday life in Punjab villages shodhganga.inflibnet.ac.in

External links
 

Punjab
Punjabi people
Ethnic groups in India
Ethnic groups in Pakistan
Punjabi tribes
Punjabi culture
Ethnic groups divided by international borders
Ethnic groups in South Asia
Indo-Aryan peoples
Linguistic groups of the constitutionally recognised official languages of India